George Henry Thomson (born 19 May 1992) is an English professional footballer who plays as a midfielder for  side Harrogate Town.

Career
Born in Melton Mowbray, Thomson started his career at Nottingham Forest as a 12 year old in 2004 and was in their academy for six years. After leaving Forest he had an 18-month spell at Glenn Hoddle's academy in Spain and Jerez Industrial, but made his competitive footballing debut for Conference North side Hinckley United against Gloucester City on 3 December 2011. He came on as a 78th-minute substitute for Danny Bragoli as the match ended in a 2–2 draw. The next season, Thomson moved to fellow Conference North side Histon, making his debut on 21 August 2012 against Boston United. He started in the 6–0 defeat for the club. After another season, Thomson moved to King's Lynn Town where he scored a hat-trick for the club in their FA Cup match against AFC Fylde.

In January 2015, Thomson signed with Conference National side Chester. He made his debut for the club on 24 January against Kidderminster Harriers. He came on as an 84th-minute substitute for Brad Abbott as Chester won 1–0. Thomson scored his first goal for the club on 10 March 2015 against Torquay United. His 29th-minute goal was the only one in a 1–0 victory. In November 2015, Thomson joined F.C. United of Manchester on a one-month loan, which was later extended to a two-month loan. He made his debut for the club on 21 November in a 2–2 draw against Nuneaton Borough. A few weeks later, on 19 December, Thomson scored his first goal for United in a 3–2 victory over Nuneaton Borough.

On 16 January 2016, it was announced that Thomson had been sold by Chester to F.C. United on a permanent basis for an undisclosed fee. He spent a season and a half with Manchester before moving to Harrogate Town. He made his debut for Harrogate Town on 5 August 2017 against Nuneaton Borough. He started and scored the first goal for Harrogate in a 4–0 victory. Thomson would go on to finish his first season with the club by helping his side earn promotion to the National League and scoring 11 goals. Two seasons later, on 2 August 2020, Thomson helped Harrogate earn promotion again to League Two. He scored the first goal in a 3–1 victory in the National League playoff final against Notts County. Later that month, he extended his contract with the club.

Career statistics

Honours
King's Lynn Town
Northern Premier League Division One South: 2012–13

Harrogate Town
National League North play-offs: 2018
National League play-offs: 2020
FA Trophy: 2019–20

References

External links
Profile at the Harrogate Town website

1992 births
Living people
Sportspeople from Melton Mowbray
Footballers from Leicestershire
English footballers
Association football midfielders
Chester F.C. players
Daventry Town F.C. players
F.C. United of Manchester players
Harrogate Town A.F.C. players
Hinckley United F.C. players
Histon F.C. players
King's Lynn Town F.C. players
National League (English football) players
English Football League players